The 1998 Cincinnati Bearcats football team represented the University of Cincinnati in the 1998 NCAA Division I-A football season. The team, coached by Rick Minter, played their home games in Nippert Stadium, as it has since 1924.

Schedule

Roster

References

Cincinnati
Cincinnati Bearcats football seasons
Cincinnati Bearcats football